Central Imenti is an electoral constituency in Kenya. It is one of nine constituencies of Meru County. It has four wards, all of which elect members' of county assembly for the Meru County Assembly. The constituency was established for the 1988 elections.

Central Imenti was one of three constituencies of the former Meru Central District.

Members of Parliament

Wards

References 

Constituencies in Eastern Province (Kenya)
1988 establishments in Kenya
Constituencies established in 1988
Constituencies in Meru County